Thomas Lyle Flick (born August 30, 1958) is a former American football quarterback who played seven seasons in the National Football League (NFL) with five teams. He played college football at the University of Washington, and is currently a corporate speaker on leadership and change.

Football

High school
Born in Maryland and raised in Bellevue, Washington, Flick attended Interlake High School and played football, basketball, and baseball. As the starting quarterback in his junior season (fall 1974), he led the Saints to 10–0 season, the Kingco championship, and a #2 ranking in the state of Washington. Leading Interlake to a repeat appearance in the Kingco championship in his senior season, Flick was recruited by many top colleges, ultimately accepting a scholarship to the University of Washington in nearby Seattle to play under second-year head coach Don James in the Pac-10 Conference.

College
Flick redshirted during his sophomore season in 1977, when the #13 Huskies, led by senior quarterback Warren Moon, upset fourth-ranked Michigan in the 1978 Rose Bowl.

As a quarterback, Flick led the Huskies to bowl games in his final two seasons: the 1979 Sun Bowl and 1981 Rose Bowl. While leading the UW to a 9–2 record and the Pac-10 championship in 1980, he set several records, including most passing yards in a single season (2,460) and longest touchdown pass (84 yards to Willie Rosborough against Air Force). Known for his accuracy, Flick set a record in 1980 for career passing percentage (60.4%), including a game against Arizona where he set a record for the highest single-game passing percentage, completing 16 of 17 passes and three touchdowns, while suffering from a concussion.

During his senior season in 1980, Flick was voted team captain and most inspirational by his teammates.  He was chosen to play in two all-star games in January 1981: the East-West Shrine Game, and Japan Bowl, as the starting quarterback.

NFL
Flick was selected in the fourth round (90th overall) of the 1981 NFL Draft by the Washington Redskins. As the third quarterback taken, he was hand-picked by first-year head coach Joe Gibbs. Traded after his rookie year to the New England Patriots, Flick continued his seven-year NFL career with the Cleveland Browns, San Diego Chargers, and New York Jets. Most of his playing time was with San Diego as the backup quarterback to hall of famer Dan Fouts, earning MVP game honors by completing 16 of 22 passes against the Super Bowl-bound Denver Broncos in 1986.

Speaking career

Known for his leadership skills during his career as a quarterback, Flick transitioned into the realm of inspirational speaking. Founding Tom Flick Communications in 1989, he started off by speaking to educational systems. An expert on leadership and change, Flick has traveled throughout North America and internationally to deliver thousands of keynotes and custom presentations to countless organizations.  Clients include Microsoft, Starbucks, Hallmark, Boeing, American Express, NASA, Ritz Carlton Hotels, and the Pentagon.

Mentored by leadership and change expert Dennis Goin, Executive Vice President of Kotter International, Flick has an alliance with Kotter International, founded by Konosuke Matsushita Professor of Leadership, Emeritus at the Harvard Business School and Chief Innovation Officer, Dr. John Kotter.

Personal life
Married since 1985, Flick and his wife, Molly, have two children, Jenny and Joe. He currently resides in Redmond, Washington.

References

External links
 Official Website

1958 births
Living people
Players of American football from Maryland
American football quarterbacks
San Diego Chargers players
New England Patriots players
Cleveland Browns players
New York Jets players
Washington Huskies football players
Washington Redskins players
People from St. Mary's County, Maryland
American motivational speakers